Ondřej Kraják (born 20 April 1991) is a Czech footballer who currently plays for FK Kratonohy. His playing position is forward.

Career 
Krajak played previously for Bohemians 1905 and AC Sparta Praha.

Notes

1991 births
Living people
Czech footballers
Sportspeople from Hradec Králové
Association football forwards
Czech First League players
Bohemians 1905 players